District Energy refers to energy production and/or storage and distribution in a distributed manner, and may refer to:

Thermal energy 
District heating - the means of providing heating for a cluster of buildings
District cooling - the means of providing cooling for a cluster of buildings

Electricity 
Distributed generation - the means of producing electric energy in a distributed manner